Caution is the fifteenth studio album by American singer-songwriter, and record producer Mariah Carey. It was released on November 16, 2018, by Epic Records. Her first studio album in four years, Carey collaborated with Ty Dolla Sign, Slick Rick, Blood Orange, and Gunna on the album's songs and worked with a variety of producers. Musically, Caution is a R&B, pop and hip hop record. The album underperformed commercially, becoming Carey's lowest selling studio album ever released, but received critical acclaim from some music critics according to Metacritic, with many calling it her most consistent work in over a decade and appeared on several year-end music lists of 2018.

The album debuted at number five on the US Billboard 200 with 51,000 album-equivalent units, of which 43,000 were pure album sales. It was supported by the singles "With You" and "A No No", however, both failed to chart on the US Hot 100 or any major music chart internationally. Carey promoted Caution through a series of public appearances and televised performances. She also embarked on the Caution World Tour in support of the album.

Background 
After Carey's fourteenth studio album, Me. I Am Mariah... The Elusive Chanteuse, Carey secured a multi-album record deal with Epic in January 2015, a subsidiary of Sony Music Entertainment. She subsequently came out with her sixth compilation album, #1 to Infinity, which includes its first and only single "Infinity" and a residency deal to perform at The Colosseum at the Caesars Palace hotel in Las Vegas. In 2017, Carey released the single "I Don't", featuring American rapper YG, which peaked at number eighty-nine on the US Billboard Hot 100, and the song "The Star", from the soundtrack for the movie of the same name.

In January 2018, Carey confirmed that she had begun work on a new album. In a March 2018 interview with Vanity Fair, Carey stated that she had recently begun work on the album. Carey finished the album in August 2018 when she recorded the title track "Caution". The track inspired Carey to change the record's original title "Portrait" to its official title "Caution".

Music and lyrics 

Consisting of 10 songs and two additional tracks featured exclusively on its Japanese issue, Caution is an R&B, hip hop and pop record that incorporates elements of EDM, psychedelia and Latin pop. Jumi Akinfenwa from Clash Magazine views the album as a "homage to the sounds prevalent at different stages of her [Mariah's] career". Mike Wass from Idolator hailed it as being "the new blueprint for legacy acts" such as Carey.

Writing for NOW Magazine, Kevin Hegge remarked that "despite the variety of styles, the most notable element of the album was its succinctness". Hegge further juxtaposed Carey's "collaborations with a handful of hot artists and producers" with the fact that she wasn't "pandering to trends" in her music. Similarly, Andrew Unterberger from Billboard summarized Caution as being "a resolutely mid tempo album", praising the production for being "uniform but not stagnant" in its "lush chillness and steady trending". Within his review, Unterberger took note of the "incredible roster of producers" credited on the album, describing them as "bending their trademark sonics" to fit into Carey's "pop-n-B comfort zone". Winston Cook-Wilson from Spin described the album's production as being the apotheosis of "trends in contemporary R&B music, absent its glitchier, experimental tendencies"; he did cite the track "Giving Me Life" as a notable exception to this rule.

Thematically, Caution has been described as "a concept album about relationships", featuring "songs about them falling apart, bops about new love and others that celebrate something more lasting". Leah Greenblatt of Entertainment Weekly similarly interpreted the album as being "a study in various degrees of incline". Nick Smith from MusicOMH felt that Carey was "at her most ethereal and reflective" on Caution, commenting that its overall narrative focused on the relationship the singer has with herself.

Composition 
The album opens with "GTFO", described as a "ghostly, tender record with a magnetic rhythm". Its EDM-influenced instrumentation is based around a sample of "Goodbye to a World" by Porter Robinson. In the song, Carey focuses on the aftermath of "a doomed relationship", her vocal delivery adding "a gratifying edge to the song’s delightful kiss-off hook". As noted by the critic Sal Cinquemani in a review for Slant Magazine, "beneath Mariah’s nonchalant delivery and kitschy patois... belies a heaviness that's perhaps informed by the song's apocalyptic source material". "With You" is a "velvety" classic R&B/soul ballad "built from little more than gospel piano and booming 808s". Its lyrics tell the story of a woman seeking safety and security in her potential partner's promises of unconditional love, with Carey viewing "romance with an open-eyed caginess".

The title-track "Caution" is a "sleek, pop-R&B hybrid", presenting Carey "on the amber traffic light; vulnerable and tentative, yet honest and hopeful about embarking on a new journey". Within the song, she considers the ephemerality of her current relationship before warning her lover to "proceed with caution", conflating the triviality of factors such as "material possessions" with her desire for her lover to "commit" to being her "everything". "A No No" is a "jagged, jazzy" hip hop track which "channels the spirit...and cadences...of TLC's "No Scrubs" while Carey exterminates "snakes in the grass" before musing on "the fact that no is the same across languages" in the song's bridge. The track itself notably contains a sample from "Rain Dance" by the Jeff Lorber Fusion, and "Crush on You" by Lil' Kim featuring The Notorious B.I.G. and Lil Cease. "The Distance" featuring Ty Dolla Sign is described as being "sleek, slow funk", with Carey speaking out against the detractors who doubted her relationship with her lover would "go the distance", setting the song during the "warm days" and "cold nights" of "late October".

"Giving Me Life", featuring Slick Rick and Blood Orange, is a psychedelia-inspired track that sees Carey admit that "a summertime love has her thinking back to being 17 and "feeling myself like I'm Norma Jeane". Lasting six minutes and 8 seconds, "she entices a lover to follow her "on another tangent" within a "big, dusky [musical] landscape" which eventually "dissolves into woozy, guitar-laced spaciousness" towards the end of the song. "One Mo' Gen" is a "bedroom anthem" that "evokes 90's R&B without sounding dated"; it sees Carey "throb with desire" over her and her lover's sexual chemistry. The Timbaland-produced "8th Grade" is an "old-school R&B" song where Carey "coos over crisp digital fingersnaps and mentholated synths", expressing an angst towards her lover's motivations.

The Gunna-assisted "Stay Long Love You" weaves "retro influences into a modern sound palette" containing heavy trap inflections, with Carey expressing desire through "a slightly quicker tempo and party vibe". Album-closer "Portrait" has been described as a "slow burning and vintage Mariah ballad". It sees the singer reveal "the inner emotional tension of having her own crosses to bear but wanting to keep them hidden from the world".

Promotion 

Carey performed "GTFO" for the first time when she headlined the 2018 iHeartRadio Music Festival on September 21, 2018. Later, she performed the album's lead single "With You" at the 2018 American Music Awards on October 9, 2018. On November 16, 2018, Carey and American singer Ty Dolla Sign performed "The Distance" on The Tonight Show with Jimmy Fallon. On November 19, 2018, Carey also performed "With You" on Good Morning America. On May 1, 2019, Carey performed the album's second single "A No No" at the 2019 Billboard Music Awards along with a medley of "Always Be My Baby", "Emotions", "We Belong Together" and "Hero".

To promote the album, Carey embarked on the Caution World Tour. It included 34 shows: twenty in the United States, three in Canada, ten in Europe, and one in Curaçao. The tour consisted mostly of theaters and small arenas, however, many of the dates did not sell out.

Singles 
"With You" was released as the album's lead single on October 4, 2018. Its music video, directed by Sarah McColgan, premiered on October 10, 2018, on her YouTube account. The song reached number seven on the US Adult Contemporary chart. Initially released as a promotional single on November 1, 2018, The album's second and final single, "A No No", was serviced to radio on March 4, 2019. Both singles failed to chart on the US Hot 100 or any major music chart internationally. 

"GTFO" was released as the first promotional single from Caution on September 13, 2018. "The Distance", which features American singer Ty Dolla Sign, succeeded it as the second promotional single from the album on October 18, 2018. Both songs reached the top 20 on the US R&B Digital Songs chart, peaking at number four and number thirteen respectively. On June 24th, 2022, Carey released "Runway", the bonus track previously only available in Japan, worldwide.

Critical reception 

At Metacritic, which assigns a normalized rating out of 100 to reviews from mainstream publications, Caution received an average score of 82, based on nine reviews, indicating "universal acclaim", which became the highest Metascore for any of Carey's albums. Maura Johnston from Pitchfork felt that the record represented a "celebration of the ultimate-diva status" of Carey's brand of music. Brittany Spanos from Rolling Stone summarised the record as being "pure hip-hop-leaning pop bliss", praising Carey's ability to deliver "an honest album, full of truths" through a "slow-burning R&B sound".

Reviewing the album for AllMusic, Andy Kellman wrote that Carey's [themes of] "flirtatious enticement, celebration, reminiscence, perseverance, rejection" were "highly energized". MusicOMH gave it a score of all five stars and stated: "[Carey] is vulnerable and tentative, yet honest and hopeful about embarking on a new journey". Spencer Kornhaber from The Atlantic stated that the album "shores up the idea of Carey the wit, the craftswoman, and the game player".

The album also appeared on several year-end lists. Bianca Gracie from Billboard stated that the record signposted Carey as "a crafty songwriter and inimitable singer".  Ranking atop Paper magazine's year-end list, Michael Love Michael commented on the significance of Cautions "tales of passion and peace" in a "politically fraught 2018", describing its ability to "resonate with women everywhere" through "the graceful pain of lived experience" as "a quiet, but nonetheless radical beauty". At the end of 2019, Caution appeared on Rated R&B's "50 Best R&B Albums of The Decade (2010s)" list.

Accolades

Commercial performance 
Caution opened at number five on the US Billboard 200 with 51,000 album-equivalent units, which included 43,000 pure album sales, becoming Carey's eighteenth top-ten album in the United States. Additionally, Caution debuted at number one on the US Top R&B/Hip-Hop Albums chart, her eighth number-one album on the chart. It also debuted at number one on the US Top R&B Albums chart, becoming her second number-one album on the chart, with her first being Me. I Am Mariah... The Elusive Chanteuse (2014). However, in its second week the album sold 5,000 units in the US, dropping fifty places from number five to number fifty-five on the Billboard 200, and dropping from number one to eight on the Top R&B Albums chart, being replaced with her own Merry Christmas holiday album. The two singles from the album, "With You" and "A No No", both failed to chart on the US Hot 100 or any major music chart internationally.

Outside the US the album faltered, debuting and peaking at number 40 on the UK Albums Chart, before leaving the chart completely the following week. The album became Carey's tenth number-one album on the UK R&B Albums chart, debuting at the top spot of the chart, replacing Eminem's Kamikaze for one week, and being replaced by that album on its second week. On Australia's ARIA Albums Chart, it entered and peaked at number 15, before leaving the chart entirely the following week. It peaked inside the top-twenty in Canada, Croatia, and Spain; the top-thirty in Japan, Greece and Portugal; and the top-forty in Belgium, Italy, the Netherlands, New Zealand, and Switzerland. Caution became Carey's lowest selling studio album, selling approximately 80,000 copies globally.

Track listing 

Notes
  signifies a co-producer
  signifies additional production

Sample credits
 "GTFO" contains a sample of "Goodbye to a World" by Porter Robinson.
 "A No No" contains a sample from "Rain Dance" by the Jeff Lorber Fusion, and "Crush on You" by Lil' Kim featuring The Notorious B.I.G. and Lil Cease.
 "Giving Me Life" contains dialogue from the film Trading Places, performed by Eddie Murphy and James D. Turner.
 "Runway" contains a sample from "Butterfly" and an interpolation of "We Belong Together", both by Carey.

Personnel 
Credits adapted from Tidal.

Performance

 Mariah Carey – all vocals, strings , executive production, songwriting , production 
 Ty Dolla Sign – featured vocals 
 Dev Hynes – featured vocals (as Blood Orange) , production 
 Slick Rick – featured vocals 
 Gunna – featured vocals 

 KOHH – featured vocals 
 Mary Ann Tatum – background vocals 
 Priscilla Renea – background vocals 
 Timbaland – background vocals , production 
 Ray Romulus – additional vocals 

Instrumentation

 Devonté Hynes – all instruments 
 Larrance Dopson – keyboards , co-production 
 Angel Lopez – keyboards , co-production , programming , recording 
 Federico Vindver – keyboards , co-production , programming , recording 
 Ray McCullough II – bass 
 Ray Romulus – drums 

 Jeremy Reeves – percussion 
 Jonathan Yip – synthesizer 
 Daniel Moore II – piano 
 Josh Baker – percussion 
 Serena McKinney Göransson – strings , violin 

Production

 Nineteen85 – production 
 DJ Mustard – production 
 Luca – production 
 No I.D. – production 
 SLMN – production 
 Shea Taylor – production 
 Lido – production , programming 
 Poo Bear – production , additional production 

 Skrillex – production , mixing 
 Fred Ball – production 
 WondaGurl – production 
 The Stereotypes – production , programming 
 Daniel Moore II – production 
 Jermaine Dupri – additional production 
 Jordan Manswell – co-production 

Technical

 Brian Garten – mixing , recording 
 Phil Tan – mixing 
 Chris Gehringer – mixing , mastering 
 Jaycen Joshua – mixing 
 Tom Norris – mixing 
 Mikaelin Bluespruce – mixing 
 Chris Galland – mixing 
 Manny Marroquin – mixing 
 James Royo – recording 
 Bill Zimmerman – engineering assistance 
 Jeremy Nichols – engineering assistance 
 Will Quinnell – engineering assistance 
 Brendan Morwaski – engineering assistance 

 Richard Evatt – engineering assistance 
 Jacob Richards – engineering assistance 
 Mike Seaberg – engineering assistance 
 Rashawn McLean – engineering assistance 
 Zach Brown – engineering assistance 
 Jason Patterson – engineering assistance 
 Matt Anthony – engineering assistance 
 Robin Florent – engineering assistance 
 Scott Desmarais – engineering assistance 
 Jered Schuerman – engineering assistance 
 Kevin "KD" Davis – mixing 
 Colin Leonard – mastering 

Artwork
 Anita Marisa Boriboon – art direction and design
 An Le – photography

Charts

Weekly charts

Year-end charts

See also 
 List of Billboard number-one R&B/hip-hop albums of 2018
 List of UK R&B Albums Chart number ones of 2018

References 

2018 albums
Mariah Carey albums
Epic Records albums
Albums produced by Dev Hynes
Albums produced by Fred Ball (producer)
Albums produced by DJ Mustard
Albums produced by Nineteen85
Albums produced by Poo Bear
Albums produced by Timbaland
Albums recorded at Electric Lady Studios
Albums recorded at Westlake Recording Studios